Frederick William Newman (February 21, 1942 – June 24, 1987) was an American professional baseball player, a right-handed pitcher who appeared in 108 games pitched, 93 as a starter, over six seasons (1962–67) for the Los Angeles/California Angels.

Newman spent that season at the Class D level in the New York–Penn League, winning only four of 14 decisions with an earned run average of 4.08, and the Red Sox left the 18-year-old off their protected list for the 1960 Major League Baseball expansion draft. The Angels then selected Newman with the 53rd overall pick.

That led the Angels to promote him to Triple-A, then to their Major League roster that September. He worked in four late-season games, including his first big-league start.

He made 64 starts, notched 17 complete games and four shutouts. But arm troubles in  began his decline as a big-league pitcher. He worked in only 24 total games in 1966–67, winning only five contests, and after trying to work through his injuries in the minor leagues, he retired after the 1968 season.

In the Majors, Newman recorded 254 strikeouts and 154 bases on balls, allowing 589 hits, in 610 innings pitched.

Newman died in Framingham, Massachusetts, in 1987 after an automobile accident in nearby Holliston. He was 45.

References

External links

1942 births
1987 deaths
Baseball players from Boston
Burlington Bees players
California Angels players
Corning Red Sox players
Dallas Rangers players
El Paso Sun Kings players
Hawaii Islanders players
Los Angeles Angels players
Major League Baseball pitchers
People from Holliston, Massachusetts
Road incident deaths in Massachusetts
San Jose Bees players
Seattle Angels players
Brookline High School alumni